Hamer Township is one of the seventeen townships of Highland County, Ohio, United States. As of the 2010 census the population was 680.

Geography
Located in the western part of the county, it borders the following townships:
Union Township - north
New Market Township - east
Whiteoak Township - south
Clay Township - southwest
Salem Township - west
Dodson Township - northwest

No municipalities are located in Hamer Township, although the unincorporated community of East Danville lies in the township's southeast.

Name and history
It is the only Hamer Township statewide.

Government
The township is governed by a three-member board of trustees, who are elected in November of odd-numbered years to a four-year term beginning on the following January 1. Two are elected in the year after the presidential election and one is elected in the year before it. There is also an elected township fiscal officer, who serves a four-year term beginning on April 1 of the year after the election, which is held in November of the year before the presidential election. Vacancies in the fiscal officership or on the board of trustees are filled by the remaining trustees.

References

External links
County website

Townships in Highland County, Ohio
Townships in Ohio